Petar Mudreša (Serbian Cyrillic: Петар Мудреша; born 1 January 1985) is a Serbian footballer who currently plays for Icelandic third-tier side Höttur/Huginn.

Club career
Despite never having played in the Serbian SuperLiga, he played in a number of lower leagues clubs such as two former top league clubs FK Bečej and FK Mladost Apatin, but also with FK Radnički Sombor and FK ČSK Čelarevo. Between January 2008 and January 2009, he played in a Premier League of Bosnia and Herzegovina club NK Čelik Zenica, and in January 2010 has decided to move abroad again, this time to the also neighbouring Albanian Superliga club FK Apolonia Fier. Since January 2011 he has been back in Serbia, this time playing for the first time in the top league by signing with FK Hajduk Kula. For the 2014–15 season, Mudreša was the member of Tápé ESK.

References

 Profile and stats at Srbijafudbal.

External links
 
 Petar Mudreša Stats at Utakmica.rs 
 FK Vrbas statstika sezona

1985 births
Living people
People from Vrbas, Serbia
Association football defenders
Serbian footballers
OFK Bečej 1918 players
FK Mladost Apatin players
NK Čelik Zenica players
FK ČSK Čelarevo players
KF Apolonia Fier players
FK Hajduk Kula players
Kaposvári Rákóczi FC players
Íþróttafélagið Höttur players
Serbian First League players
Serbian SuperLiga players
2. deild karla players
3. deild karla players
Serbian expatriate footballers
Expatriate footballers in Bosnia and Herzegovina
Serbian expatriate sportspeople in Bosnia and Herzegovina
Expatriate footballers in Albania
Serbian expatriate sportspeople in Albania
Expatriate footballers in Hungary
Serbian expatriate sportspeople in Hungary
Expatriate footballers in Iceland
Serbian expatriate sportspeople in Iceland